Bagh-e Rajab (also Romanized as Bāgh-e Rajab) is a village in Firuraq Rural District, in the Central District of Khoy County, West Azerbaijan Province, Iran. As of the 2006 census, its population was 127, in 23 families.

References 

Populated places in Khoy County